Hickory is a town in Newton County, Mississippi. The population was 530 at the 2010 census. The town is named after Andrew Jackson, nicknamed "Old Hickory," who passed through the area on his way to fight the Battle of New Orleans during the War of 1812.

Geography

Demographics

2020 census

As of the 2020 United States census, there were 408 people, 157 households, and 137 families residing in the town.

2000 census
As of the census of 2000, there were 499 people, 190 households, and 137 families residing in the town. The population density was 535.9 people per square mile (207.2/km2). There were 207 housing units at an average density of 222.3 per square mile (85.9/km2). The racial makeup of the town was 43.69% White, 55.11% African American, 0.20% Native American, and 1.00% from two or more races. Hispanic or Latino of any race were 0.60% of the population.

There were 190 households, out of which 32.6% had children under the age of 18 living with them, 42.1% were married couples living together, 24.2% had a female householder with no husband present, and 27.4% were non-families. 24.7% of all households were made up of individuals, and 13.7% had someone living alone who was 65 years of age or older. The average household size was 2.63 and the average family size was 3.10.

In the town, the population was spread out, with 29.3% under the age of 18, 9.6% from 18 to 24, 27.3% from 25 to 44, 18.8% from 45 to 64, and 15.0% who were 65 years of age or older. The median age was 35 years. For every 100 females, there were 80.8 males. For every 100 females age 18 and over, there were 68.1 males.

The median income for a household in the town was $25,417, and the median income for a family was $29,286. Males had a median income of $30,313 versus $20,000 for females. The per capita income for the town was $11,700. About 21.4% of families and 26.1% of the population were below the poverty line, including 32.1% of those under age 18 and 39.7% of those age 65 or over.

Education
The Town of Hickory is served by the Newton County School District.

Notable people
 Charlie Armstrong, former NFL Halfback, fullback, quarterback
 Joe Gibbon, professional baseball player
 Mike Granger, sprinter
 D. Michael Hurst Jr., United States Attorney for the United States District Court for the Southern District of Mississippi
 Bob Johnson, founder of BET
 Georgia Tann, former head of the Tennessee Children's Home Society

References

Towns in Newton County, Mississippi
Towns in Mississippi